Anatoliy Hryhorovych Drabovskyi (born 1 August 1958) is a Ukrainian scientist and educator. Rector of Vinnytsia Cooperative Institute. People's Deputy of Ukraine of the 9th convocation from the party "Servant of the People".

Biography 
Anatoliy Drabovsky was born on August 1, 1958, in the city of Vinnytsia.

He graduated from the Kyiv Institute of Trade and Economics (specialty "Trade Economics"). Doctor of Economics.

In 1998 he started working as the deputy director of the Vinnytsia Cooperative Technical School for Academic Affairs, and eight months later he headed it. In 2009, he was elected Vice President of the Vinnytsia Regional Weightlifting Federation.

In 2016, he established international cooperation with the Higher School of Economics and Law in Kielce, thanks to which a double degree program was introduced.

In 2002 and 2010 he ran for Vinnytsia City Council.

He was a candidate for People's Deputies from the "Servant of the People" party in the 2019 parliamentary elections (constituency No. 12, Vinnytsia, Vinnytsia district). At the time of the election he was Rector of the Vinnytsia Cooperative Institute. He lives in Vinnytsia; he is non-partisan.

He is a member of the Verkhovna Rada Committee on Budget.

Notes 

1958 births
Living people
Politicians from Vinnytsia
Ninth convocation members of the Verkhovna Rada
Servant of the People (political party) politicians